Peter Thomas McPhee (born 29 July 1963) was an Australian cricketer who played for the Tasmanian Tigers.
He represented Australia in 3 Youth Tests against Pakistan in 1981/2, dismissing Salik Malik in 5 of 6 innings.
McPhee represented the Prime Minister's XI in 1992 and took a wicket with his debut ball in both first-class cricket and one-day domestic cricket.

External links
 

1963 births
Living people
Tasmania cricketers
Australian cricketers
Cricketers from Brisbane
20th-century Australian people